The women's modern pentathlon at the 2020 Summer Olympics in Tokyo was held on 5 and 6 August 2021. Two venues were used: Musashino Forest Sport Plaza (fencing) and Tokyo Stadium (swimming, horse-riding and combined running and shooting).

Schedule 
All times are Japan Standard Time (UTC+9)

Results 
Thirty-six athletes participated.
Key

Records

References

Modern pentathlon at the 2020 Summer Olympics
Women's events at the 2020 Summer Olympics